Crays Pond is a hamlet situated in the parish of Goring Heath in South Oxfordshire.

Notable residents

Notable residents of Crays Pond include the Russian ballet dancers Rudolf Nureyev and Mikhail Baryshnikov who both lived in the same Russian-owned safe house at different times.

In 2016 Crays Pond 71-year old resident Doreen Pechey became the oldest person in Britain to pass the Royal Academy of Dance's grade 6 ballet exam and was dubbed "Britain's oldest ballerina".

References

South Oxfordshire District
Hamlets in Oxfordshire